The Worlds of Frank Herbert (1970) is a collection of eight short stories written by science fiction author Frank Herbert.  All of the stories in this collection had been previously published in magazines.

Contents
"The GM Effect" - short story - Analog, June 1965
"The Featherbedders" - novelette - Analog, August 1967
"Old Rambling House" - short story - Galaxy Science Fiction, April 1958
"Committee of the Whole" - short story - Galaxy Magazine, April 1965
"Escape Felicity" - short story - Analog, June 1966
"By the Book" - short story - Analog, August 1966.
"Mating Call" - short story - Galaxy Magazine, October 1961
"The Tactful Saboteur" - novelette - Galaxy Magazine, October 1964
"A-W-F, Unlimited" - novelette - Galaxy Magazine, June 1961

References

External links
DuneNovels.com ~ Official site of Dune and Herbert Limited Partnership

1970 short story collections
Short story collections by Frank Herbert
New English Library books